The Brindabella Range, commonly called The Brindabellas or The Brindies, is a mountain range located in Australia, on a state and territory border of New South Wales and the Australian Capital Territory (ACT). The range rises to the west of Canberra, the capital city of Australia, and includes the Namadgi National Park in the ACT and the Bimberi Nature Reserve and Brindabella National Park in New South Wales. The Brindabellas are visible to the west of Canberra and form an important part of the city's landscape.

Location and features
The Brindabella Range is located in the northern tip of the Australian Alps bioregion, marking the dividing line with the southern tip of the South Eastern Highlands bioregion and the eastern limits of the Riverina. From this point the range heads generally south, towards the eastern watershed of the Murrumbidgee River, in a line that marks the western edge of the ACT border with NSW. The most southern point of the range is at Bimberi Gap on the Australian Capital Territory and New South Wales border. The range is located adjacent to the Bag Range, Baldy Range, Codys Ridge, Dingi Dingi Ridge and Webbs Ridge. Scabby Range and Bimberi Range lie to the south.

The geology of the range comprises block-faulted granites and Palaeozoic metamorphic rocks. There are small areas of Tertiary basalt with buried river gravels and lake sediments. The typical characteristics of the range include low-relief high plains with steep margins and slopes and fault aligned river valleys with deep gorges and waterfalls. Soils in the range change with altitude. At lower levels in forests, texture contrast soils are the norm. In the sub-alpine snow gum areas deep gradational soils with moderate amounts of organic matter are common.

Vegetation changes with altitude, aspect, cold air drainage and soil saturation. Low elevations with dry aspects carry red stringybark, white gum, broad-leaved peppermint, candlebark and brittle gum. Moist sites have alpine ash, mountain gum, narrow-leaved peppermint, manna gum and brown barrel, with tree ferns, blackwood and sassafras in gullies. Common species include snow grasses, leafy bossiaea, yellow kunzea, alpine pepper and sphagnum bogs, with candle heath and swamp heath. Common species include prickly snow grass, alpine wallaby grass, silver snow daisy, ribbony grass, white purslane, eyebrights, gentians and buttercups. Most alpine species have a limited range.

Peaks

Nature reserves and national parks
The valley is on the edge of the Snowy Mountains and the Goodradigbee River flows through the valley.

History
The traditional custodians of the area now known as the Brindabella Range are the Ngunnawal, Walgalu and Djimantan, all Aboriginal Australian peoples.

The Brindabella Valley, located in New South Wales to the west of the range, was first settled by Europeans as a stock outstation for the Yarralumla station in the 1830s, with the first land grant made in 1849. Gold was found in 1860 and mined from the 1880s. In 1887 the Brindabella Gold Mining Company was formed and mining continued until 1910.  The valley is now an agricultural area and consists of a number of small cattle farms including the heritage-listed Brindabella Station, the childhood home of Miles Franklin, an early 20th-century Australian author.

Australian author Miles Franklin grew up in the Brindabella Valley and wrote an autobiographical work, Childhood at Brindabella, which told of her early life in the valley.

Etymology
The name brindabella is said to mean “two kangaroo rats” in one of the local Aboriginal language.  However, another account states that "Brindy brindy" was a local term meaning water running over rocks and bella was added by the Europeans from the Italian bella vista, meaning "beautiful view".

Snow country

The most northerly ski fields in Australia are located in the Brindabella Range and include the Namadgi National Park in the ACT and Bimberi Nature Reserve and Brindabella National Park in New South Wales.

A ski chalet was constructed at Mount Franklin in 1938 to service the Canberra Alpine Club. Ski runs were cleared and ski tows were improvised. The chalet later operated as a museum before being destroyed in the 2003 Canberra bushfires. A new shelter designed and built by University of Adelaide students opened in 2008. Today, cross country skiing is possible in the area, when conditions allow.

A development plan was drafted following the 2003 bushfires which would see three  chairlifts installed together with snowmaking facilities and accommodation at this site.

Climate

Gallery

See also

Skiing in Australia
Skiing in New South Wales
List of mountains in Australia

References

External links
 

 

Mountains of the Australian Capital Territory
Borders of the Australian Capital Territory

Borders of New South Wales
Mountain ranges of New South Wales
Mountain ranges of the Australian Capital Territory